Olga Bakaldina (born 28 March 1985) is a Russian swimmer. She competed at the 2000 Summer Olympics in the 100 m and 200 m breaststroke and 4×100 m medley relay and finished in 17th, 5th and 9th place, respectively.

References

External links
Olga BAKALDINA. les-sports.info
Ольга Бакалдина. i-swimmer.ru

1985 births
Living people
Olympic swimmers of Russia
Swimmers at the 2000 Summer Olympics
Russian female swimmers
Russian female breaststroke swimmers
Sportspeople from Volgograd